Nicola Modesti (born 9 May 1990 in Teramo) is an Italian goalkeeper who currently plays for Martina Franca on loan from L'Aquila.

References

External links
L'Aquila Calcio profile

1990 births
Living people
People from Teramo
Italian footballers
S.S. Teramo Calcio players
L'Aquila Calcio 1927 players
Association football goalkeepers
Sportspeople from the Province of Teramo
Footballers from Abruzzo